Maura Kinsella (born July 8, 1991) is an American professional racing cyclist. She rides for the Optum-Kelly Benefit Strategies team.

See also
 List of 2015 UCI Women's Teams and riders

References

External links

1991 births
Living people
American female cyclists
Place of birth missing (living people)